John McDonald Dodds (10 January 1907 – 1982) was a Scottish amateur footballer who represented Great Britain at the 1936 Summer Olympics. Dodds played as a centre forward in the Scottish League for Queen's Park and represented Scotland at amateur level.

References

1907 births
1982 deaths
Scottish footballers
Queen's Park F.C. players
Footballers at the 1936 Summer Olympics
Olympic footballers of Great Britain
Scotland amateur international footballers
Association football forwards